This article features a listing of all professional sports teams based in the United Kingdom, in addition to teams from other countries that compete in professional leagues featuring teams from the United Kingdom.

Football

Premier League

EFL Championship

EFL League One

EFL League Two

Scottish Premiership

Scottish Championship

FA Women's Super League

Rugby Union

Premiership Rugby

United Rugby Championship

7 of the 16 teams in the United Rugby Championship operate within the United Kingdom - 2 in Scotland, 4 in Wales, and 1 in Northern Ireland (although this team also represents three counties in Ireland. The remaining teams; 3 in Ireland, 2 in Italy and 4 in South Africa play away matches in the UK, but are based outside it.

Rugby League

Super League

2 Super League teams, Catalan Dragons and Toulouse Olympique, play all their away fixtures in the United Kingdom, but are based in France, playing their home fixtures there.

RFL Championship
Leigh Centurions are the only professional team in the Championship which is mostly semi-professional. Newcastle Thunder have been professional as recently as 2022. London Broncos and Widnes Vikings have been professional within the last five years.

Cricket

County Championship (England and Wales)

The Hundred

Eight new franchises were created for the new hundred-ball format by the England and Wales Cricket board, each featuring a men's and a women's team.

Inter-Provincial Championship (Ireland)

Two of the four teams in the all-island Inter-Provincial Championship operate in Northern Ireland. Both teams' home grounds do not have a permanent stand but are able to host crowds of the following capacities as required:

Basketball

British Basketball League

Netball

Netball Superleague

Ice Hockey

Elite Ice Hockey League

Swimming

International Swimming League

One team from the United Kingdom, London Roar, compete in the International Swimming League

References

External links 
 Official website

Sport in the United Kingdom